John Henry Holland (February 2, 1929 – August 9, 2015) was an American scientist and Professor of psychology and Professor of electrical engineering and computer science at the University of Michigan, Ann Arbor. He was a pioneer in what became known as  genetic algorithms.

Biography
John Henry Holland was born on 2 February 1929 in Fort Wayne, Allen County, Indiana, son of Gustave A. Holland (b. 24 July 1896 in Russian Poland; only son of Christopher Holland and Appolonia Greiber / Graeber; three sisters) and Mildred P. Gfroerer (b. 1 July 1901
in Columbus Grove, Ohio; the second of three daughters of John Joseph Gfroerer and Ila Savilla "Ily S." Kiefer). He had one younger sister, Shirley Ann "Hollie" Holland (b. about 1931; m1. c.1955 John William Ringgenberg (div. bef. 3 Aug 1968, d. 1982), had issue; m2. 2003 to Albert Vernon "Vern" Kinner (d. 2015)).

Holland studied physics at the Massachusetts Institute of Technology and received a B.S. degree in 1950. He then studied Mathematics at the University of Michigan, receiving an M.A. in 1954. In 1959, he received the first computer science Ph.D. from the University of Michigan. He was a Professor of psychology and Professor of electrical engineering and computer science at the University of Michigan, Ann Arbor. He held visiting positions at the Rowland Institute for Science and the University of Bergen.

"Holland is best known for his role as a founding father of the complex systems approach. In particular, he developed genetic algorithms and learning classifier systems. These foundational building blocks of an evolutionary approach to optimization are now included in all texts on optimization and programming." – Carl Simon, professor of mathematics, economics, complex systems and public policy

Holland was a member of the Board of Trustees and Science Board of the Santa Fe Institute and a fellow of the World Economic Forum.

Holland received the 1961 Louis E. Levy Medal from The Franklin Institute, and the MacArthur Fellowship in 1992.

He was profiled extensively in chapters 5 and 7 of the book Complexity (1993), by M. Mitchell Waldrop.

Holland died on August 9, 2015 in Ann Arbor, Michigan.

Work
Holland frequently lectured around the world on his own research, and on research and open questions in complex adaptive systems (CAS) studies. In 1975, he wrote the ground-breaking book on genetic algorithms, "Adaptation in Natural and Artificial Systems". He also developed Holland's schema theorem.

Publications
Holland authored a number of books about complex adaptive systems, including:
Adaptation in Natural and Artificial Systems (1975, MIT Press)
Hidden Order: How Adaptation Builds Complexity (1995, Basic Books); reviewed by Mark S. Miller in Reason
Emergence: From Chaos to Order (1998, Basic Books)
Signals and Boundaries: Building Blocks for Complex Adaptive Systems (2012, MIT Press)
Complexity: A Very Short Introduction (2014, Oxford University Press)

Articles, a selection:
"A universal computer capable of executing an arbitrary number of subprograms simultaneously", in: Proc. Eastern Joint Comp. Conf. (1959), pp. 108–112
"Iterative circuit computers", in: Proc. Western Joint Comp. Conf. (1960), pp. 259–265
"Outline for a logical theory of adaptive systems", in: JACM, Vol 9 (1962), no. 3, pp. 279–314
"Hierarchical descriptions, universal spaces, and adaptive systems", in: Arthur W. Burks, editor. Essays on Cellular Automata (1970). University of Illinois Press
"Using Classifier Systems to Study Adaptive Nonlinear Networks", in: Daniel L. Stein, editor. Lectures in the Sciences of Complexity (1989). Addison Wesley
"Concerning the Emergence of Tag-Mediated Lookahead in Classifier Systems", in: Stephanie Forrest, editor. Emergent Computation: self-organizing, collective, and cooperative phenomena in natural and computing networks (1990). MIT Press
"The Royal Road for Genetic Algorithms: Fitness Landscapes and GA Performance", in: Francisco J. Varela, Paul Bourgine, editors. Toward a Practice of Autonomous Systems: proceedings of the first European conference on Artificial Life (1992). MIT Press
"Echoing Emergence: objectives, rough definitions, and speculations for ECHO-class models", in: George A. Cowan, David Pines, David Meltzer, editors. Complexity: metaphors, models, and reality (1994), Addison-Wesley
"Can There Be A Unified Theory of Complex Adaptive Systems?", in: Harold J. Morowitz, Jerome L. Singer, editors. The Mind, The Brain, and Complex Adaptive Systems (1995). Addison-Wesley
"Board Games", in: John Brockman, editor. The Greatest Inventions of the Past 2000 Years (2000). Phoenix
"What is to Come and How to Predict It.", in: John Brockman, editor. The Next Fifty Years: science in the first half of the twenty-first century (2002). Weidenfeld & Nicolson

References

External links

 Complexity science pioneer John Holland passes away at 86 at santafe.edu
 Biography
 Echo project of John Holland at the Santa Fe Institute

1929 births
2015 deaths
20th-century American psychologists
American cognitive scientists
Complex systems scientists
University of Michigan faculty
University of Michigan College of Literature, Science, and the Arts alumni
Massachusetts Institute of Technology alumni
MacArthur Fellows
Artificial intelligence researchers
Santa Fe Institute people
Researchers of artificial life